Hayesville is a town in Clay County, North Carolina, United States. The population was 311 at the 2010 census. It is the county seat of Clay County.

Geography
Hayesville is located at  (35.046630, −83.817883).

The Hiwassee River flows along the outskirts of Hayesville.

Climate
According to the Koppen climate classification, Hayesville has a humid subtropical climate, with cool winters and hot summers.

History 
This was long an area of indigenous settlement along the Hiwassee River. An earthwork platform mound was built here, likely by people of the South Appalachian Mississippian culture about 1000 CE. It would have been the center of their village. 

Later, the historic Cherokee developed a town known as Quanassee at this site. They built their townhouse on top of the mound, to provide a place for communal discussion and reaching consensus. The town is shown on a 1725 colonial map as Qunassee; it was one of the numerous "Valley Towns" located along the Hiwassee River in Western North Carolina. It was also along the Trading Path (also called the "Unicoi Turnpike"). That road led from Quanassee west to another town at present-day Murphy, North Carolina, then over the Unicoi Range at Unicoi Gap and down to the Cherokee town of Great Tellico (today Tellico Plains, Tennessee) (Duncan 2003:245).

After the Cherokee were forced to cede their land, European Americans settled in this rural area and took over what is now known as the Spikebuck Town Mound and Village Site. They cultivated much of the village site, disturbing the topsoil layers. Some excavations were conducted in the 1960s and 1970s. The town mound and village site was listed in 1982 on the National Register of Historic Places as an archeological site. 

Clay County acquired the mound site in 2000 and protects it; the Archeological Conservancy acquired the town/village site and farmsteads in 2011.

The town was named Hayesville after 19th-century politician George Hayes. When running for representative from Cherokee County in the fall election of 1860, he learned that residents in the southeast end wanted to separate from Cherokee County and get their own county seat, because of the difficulty of traveling to the distant location. With the promise to introduce legislation to this effect, Hayes won a seat in the legislature. In February 1861 the legislation to organize a new county was introduced and passed by the North Carolina General Assembly. The county was named in honor of Kentucky statesman Henry Clay, and the county seat Hayesville, for Hayes.

The town of Hayesville was incorporated on March 12, 1913. The first mayor of Hayesville was S.E. Hogsed.

Late 20th century to present
Clay County is featuring Cherokee heritage sites as part of its community redevelopment to emphasize its unique character. In addition to the Spikebuck Town Mound, it supports other Cherokee resources in Hayesville: the Quanassee Path, which highlights five Cherokee features on a walking path around Hayesville; the Cherokee Homestead Exhibit, with reconstructions of traditional summer and winter houses and a corn crib; and the Cherokee Botanical Sanctuary. In addition the CCCRA sponsors an annual Cherokee Heritage Festival.

Demographics

2020 census

As of the 2020 United States census, there were 461 people, 161 households, and 83 families residing in the town.

2010 census
At the census of 2010, there were 311 people, 147 households, and 84 families residing in the town. The population density was 666.6 people per square mile. There were 171 housing units at an average density of 384.7 per square mile (150.1/km2). The racial makeup of the town was 99.33% White, 0.34% African American, and 0.34% from two or more races. Hispanic or Latino of any race were 1.35% of the population.

There were 147 households, out of which 21.1% had children under the age of 18 living with them, 39.5% were married couples living together, 12.9% had a female householder with no husband present, and 44.9% were non-families. 42.9% of all households were made up of individuals, and 19.0% had someone living alone who was 65 years of age or older. The average household size was 1.99 and the average family size was 2.73.

In the town, the population was spread out, with 20.5% under the age of 18, 8.1% from 18 to 24, 23.6% from 25 to 44, 23.2% from 45 to 64, and 24.6% who were 65 years of age or older. The median age was 43 years. For every 100 females, there were 85.6 males. For every 100 females age 18 and over, there were 77.4 males.

The median income for a household in the town was $20,000, and the median income for a family was $30,938. Males had a median income of $21,667 versus $16,500 for females. The per capita income for the town was $12,281. About 7.7% of families and 14.7% of the population were below the poverty line, including 7.4% of those under the age of eighteen and 8.2% of those 65 or over.

Local cities

Nearby communities 

Notable people 
 Mark Linkous, musician of the band Sparklehorse, lived in Hayesville for a few years and operated a recording studio in the area
 George Washington Truett, Southern Baptist clergyman and 47-year pastor for the First Baptist Church of Dallas

References

Further reading
 Duncan, Barbara R. and Riggs, Brett H. Cherokee Heritage Trails Guidebook. University of North Carolina Press: Chapel Hill (2003). 
Moore, Carl S. Clay County Then and Now: A Written and Pictorial History. Genealogy Publishing Service: Franklin, NC (2007). 
Padgett, Guy. A History of Clay County, North Carolina. Clay County Bicentennial Committee (1976). ASIN: B0006WPT26

External links
 

Towns in Clay County, North Carolina
Towns in North Carolina
County seats in North Carolina
Populated places on the Hiwassee River